Paul Alexandre Belmondo (born 23 April 1963) is a French racing driver who raced in Formula One for the March and Pacific Racing teams. He was born in Boulogne-Billancourt, Hauts-de-Seine, the son of actor Jean-Paul Belmondo and grandson of sculptor Paul Belmondo. Around 1981, Paul gained publicity for becoming the lover of Princess Stéphanie of Monaco.

Through 1987, he participated in Formula 3 and Formula 3000, although he was never a top 10 championship finisher in either. In 1992, he joined the March F1 team as a pay driver, getting a ninth place at the Hungarian Grand Prix, but only qualifying 4 more times before he ran out of money and was replaced by Emanuele Naspetti. Two years later he became a member of the uncompetitive Pacific Grand Prix team, where he only qualified for two races and was usually behind teammate Bertrand Gachot. Thereafter he concentrated on GT racing, at the wheel of a Chrysler Viper GTS-R. He started his own team, Paul Belmondo Racing, which raced in the FIA GT Championship and Le Mans Endurance Series championship before folding in 2007.

Racing record

24 Hours of Le Mans results

Complete International Formula 3000 results
(key) (Races in bold indicate pole position; races in italics indicate fastest lap.)

Complete Formula One results
(key)

Complete JGTC results
(key)

Personal life 
Belmondo married Luana Tenca (born Rome, 18 March 1971) in 1990. Luana Belmondo is a former model who is now a TV chef and broadcaster. The couple has three children.

References

External links
Biography on F1 Rejects

1963 births
Living people
Sportspeople from Boulogne-Billancourt
French racing drivers
French Formula One drivers
March Formula One drivers
Pacific Formula One drivers
French people of Italian descent
French people of Sicilian descent
24 Hours of Le Mans drivers
International Formula 3000 drivers
European Le Mans Series drivers
Porsche Supercup drivers
World Sportscar Championship drivers
24 Hours of Spa drivers
Dakar Rally drivers
Oreca drivers
German Formula Three Championship drivers
Jaguar Racing drivers
David Price Racing drivers
Team Joest drivers
GT4 European Series drivers